The Loserkids Tour was a concert tour by rock band Blink-182. Launched in support of the group's 1999 album Enema of the State, the tour visited amphitheatres and arenas in November 1999. The tour was supported by Silverchair and Fenix*TX.

The November 4–5 shows were recorded for the band's live album The Mark, Tom, and Travis Show (The Enema Strikes Back!), which would be released a year later.

Tour dates

Notes

External links
 

Blink-182 concert tours
1999 concert tours